Veronica Martha Agowa Quarshie is a Ghanaian veteran producer, director and screenwriter, known to have changed the then status quo of storylines where women were portrayed as back benchers. She changed the narrative of women from an obscure, stilted and gender imbalanced story lines to women who owned their space.

Education 
Quarshie had her training in movie production from the National Film and Television Institute in 1992, where she graduated with a major in Film Directing.

Career 
After graduating, Quarshie began her career as a film producer. She produced her first movie, Twin Lover, by Piro Production in 1994. Since then she has produced several others including the award- winning Ripples and A Stab in the Dark. She has worked with big companies such as the Ghana Broadcasting Corporation, TV Africa, Film Africa Limited and Princess Films in Accra. She has served and is still serving currently on the jury of several award schemes including the Golden Movie Awards.

Awards and recognition 
She has won several awards for her work. Some of the awards she has won include:

 1992 - Best Student Directing Award - National Film and Television Institute Awards
 2001 - Best Film Directing Award - Ghana Film Awards
 2002 - Best Film Directing Award - Ghana Film Awards

Works 
Some of the movies she produced include:

 1994 - Twin Lover
 1995 - Tears of Joy
 1996 - Come Back Lucy
 1997 - Thicker Than Blood
 1999 - A Stab in the Dark
2000 - A Stab in the Dark 2
2000 - Ripples: A Stab in the Dark 3
 The 3rd Night
 2000 - Shadows from the Past
 2001 - A Call at Midnight
2003 - Rage: Ripples 2
 Otilia and Xcapades 
2017 - Forbidden Fruit

Personal life 
She is married to Samuel Nai with a son.

References

Living people
Ghanaian film producers
Ghanaian screenwriters
Ghanaian women film directors
Ghanaian film directors
Ghanaian women film producers
Alumni of the National Film and Television School
Year of birth missing (living people)
Ghanaian women screenwriters